1564 Srbija, provisional designation , is a dark asteroid from the outer region of the asteroid belt, approximately 36 kilometers in diameter. It was discovered on 15 October 1936, by Serbian astronomer Milorad Protić at the Belgrade Astronomical Observatory in Serbia. It is named for the country of Serbia.

Classification and orbit 

The C-type asteroid is also classified as an X-type in the Tholen taxonomy. It orbits the Sun in the outer main-belt at a distance of 2.5–3.8 AU once every 5 years and 8 months (2,070 days). Its orbit has an eccentricity of 0.20 and an inclination of 11° with respect to the ecliptic.

Physical characteristics 

Astronomers Maryanne Angliongto and Milan Mijic at Cal State LA, United States, obtained a rotational lightcurve of Srbija in May 2006. It gave a rotation period of 29.64 hours with a brightness variation of 0.37 magnitude. In November 2009, photometric observations by James W. Brinsfield at Via Capote Observatory , California, gave a shorter period of 9.135 hours with an amplitude of 0.17.

According to the space-based surveys carried out by the Japanese Akari satellite and NASA's Wide-field Infrared Survey Explorer with its subsequent NEOWISE mission, Srbija measures between 29.48 and 43.23 kilometers in diameter, and its surface has an albedo between 0.042 and 0.10. The Collaborative Asteroid Lightcurve Link assumes a standard albedo for carbonaceous asteroids of 0.057 and calculates a diameter of 37.12 kilometers with an absolute magnitude of 10.88.

Naming 

This minor planet was named in honour of the now sovereign state of Serbia in its transliterated native pronunciation ( / ). Srbijas discovery in 1936 was the first minor planet discovery made at Belgrade Observatory. The official  was published by the Minor Planet Center in December 1952.

References

External links 
 Asteroid Lightcurve Database (LCDB), query form (info )
 Dictionary of Minor Planet Names, Google books
 Asteroids and comets rotation curves, CdR – Observatoire de Genève, Raoul Behrend
 Discovery Circumstances: Numbered Minor Planets (1)-(5000)  – Minor Planet Center
 
 

001564
Discoveries by Milorad B. Protić
Named minor planets
001564
19361015